Aetideidae is a family of copepods belonging to the order Calanoida.

Genera

The family contains the following genera:

Aetideopsis 
Aetideus 
Azygokeras 
Batheuchaeta 
Bradyetes 
Bradyidius 
Chiridiella 
Chiridius 
Chirundina 
Chirundinella 
Comantenna 
Crassantenna 
Euchirella 
Farrania 
Gaetanus 
Gaidiopsis 
Jaschnovia 
Lutamator 
Mesocomantenna 
Mesogaidius 
Paivella 
Parabradyidius 
Paracomantenna 
Prolutamator 
Pseudeuchaeta 
Pseudochirella 
Pseudoothrix 
Pseudotharybis 
Pterochirella 
Senecella 
Sursamucro 
Undeuchaeta 
Valdiviella

References

Copepods